Dusan Stevanović (born 21 April 1992) is a Serbian-American football player who plays for California United FC II in the United Premier Soccer League.

Career
Stevanović was born in Serbia, but grew up in the United States. He began his career with FK Sinđelić Beograd, spending time on loan with both FK Sopot and FK BASK. Stevanović made the move back to the United States, signing with third-tier side Orange County Blues in and has now joined California United FC II in 2018.

References

External links
 

1992 births
Living people
Footballers from Belgrade
Serbian footballers
FK Sinđelić Beograd players
FK BASK players
Serbian expatriate footballers
Expatriate soccer players in the United States
Serbian expatriate sportspeople in the United States
Orange County SC players
USL Championship players
Soccer players from California
Association football midfielders